Émeline Charles (born 27 October 1999) is a Haitian footballer who plays as a centre back for the Haiti women's national team.

International career
Charles made a senior appearance for Haiti on 3 October 2019.

References

External links 
 

1999 births
Living people
Women's association football central defenders
Haitian women's footballers
Sportspeople from Port-au-Prince
Haiti women's international footballers
Haitian expatriate footballers
Haitian expatriate sportspeople in Canada
Expatriate women's soccer players in Canada
A.S. Blainville players